World of Men is a successful gay pornographic film series of 12 productions, directed by Collin O'Neal and produced by Collin O'Neal Productions. Each of the series is based on shooting in a specific city or country (in alphabetical order): Argentina, Australia, Colombia, East Berlin, Edinburgh, Lebanon, Miami, Santo Domingo, Serbia, Spain, Turkey and Cum Fly With Collin.

Selective filmography

Awards / Nominations
 2007 GayVN Award winner - Best Pro/Am Release
 2007 Grabby Award winner - Best Videography - Dan Fox & Collin O'Neal (Lebanon)
 2007 Grabby Award nominee - Best Three-Way Sex Scene (Lebanon) with François Sagat, Collin O'Neal & Jacko
 2008 GayVN Award nominee - Best Ethnic-Themed Video, Latin (São Paulo)
 2008 Grabby Award nominee - Best International Video (São Paulo)
 2008 GayVN Award nominee - Best Actor, Foreign Release - Francisco Rey (Santo Domingo)
 2008 GayVN Award nominee - Best Ethnic-Themed Video, Latin (Santo Domingo)

References

External links
 
 
 Collin O'Neal Website

Specific films
 World of Men: São Paulo
 World of Men: London
 World of Men: Lebanon
 World of Men: Miami
 World of Men: Santo Domingo
 World of Men: Spain
 World of Men: Edinburgh
 World of Men: East Berlin

2000s pornographic films
Pornographic film series